Deinopidae, also known as net casting spiders, is a family of cribellate spiders first described by Carl Ludwig Koch in 1850. It consists of stick-like elongated spiders that catch prey by stretching a web across their front legs before propelling themselves forward. These unusual webs will stretch two or three times their relaxed size, entangling any prey that touch them. The posterior median eyes have excellent night vision, allowing them to cast nets accurately in low-light conditions. These eyes are larger than the others, and sometimes makes these spiders appear to only have two eyes. Ogre-faced spiders (Deinopis) are the best known genus in this family. The name refers to the perceived physical similarity to the mythological creature of the same name. This family also includes the humped-back spiders (Menneus).

They are distributed through tropics worldwide from Australia to Africa and the Americas. In Florida, Deinopis often hangs upside down from a silk line under palmetto fronds during the day. At night, it emerges to practice its unusual prey capture method on invertebrate prey. Its eyes are able to gather available light more efficiently than the eyes of cats and owls, and are able to do this despite the lack of a reflective layer (tapetum lucidum); instead, each night, a large area of light-sensitive membrane is manufactured within the eyes, and since arachnid eyes do not have irises, it is rapidly destroyed again at dawn.

Genera

Two genera formerly included in this family, Avella O. P-Cambridge, 1877 and Avellopsis Purcell, 1904, are now placed in Menneus. , the World Spider Catalog accepts the following genera:

Asianopis Lin & Li, 2020 – Asia
Deinopis Macleay, 1839 – Every continent, except Europe and Antarctica
Menneus Simon, 1876 – Africa, Australia

See also
 List of Deinopidae species

References

 
Araneomorphae families
Taxa named by Carl Ludwig Koch